The Home Building Association Bank (or Home Building Association Company) is a historic building located at 1 North Third Street in Newark, Ohio, and was designed by noted Chicago architect Louis Sullivan. It is one of eight banks designed by Sullivan. In 1973, it was added to the National Register of Historic Places.

Of note is the building's rather high number of owners: since its construction, Home Building Association Bank has been home to two financial institutions, a butcher shop, a jewelry store, and an ice cream parlor. Its interior was modified for each occupant.

For this project, Sullivan was given a narrow lot but made the building larger by making it two stories high, something that he did not typically do in his banks. The color scheme chosen here deviates from his normal red-brown brick tapestry surface. Instead the building is covered with gray-green terra cotta slabs that are edged with typical Sullivanesque border designs. The ornamentation included a winged lion quite similar to the ones to be found in Cedar Rapids, Grinnell and Sidney. Little mention is made in the literature about Sullivan as to why these creatures populate his banks. Also unique is the presence of Sullivan's name in the tile mosaic over the front door.

History 
The Home Building Association Bank was built in 1914 and opened on August 25, 1915, as The Home Building Association Company, commonly known as “The Old Home”. It was one of three banks designed by Sullivan in 1914, the other two being in Grinnell, Iowa, and in West Lafayette, Indiana.

In 1942, the Home Building Association Bank was sold to William Camlin. From 1943 to 1946, Sanitary Meat Market occupied the building, and from 1946 to 1973, Symon's Best Jewelry Company took over.

The building was added to the National Register of Historic Places on July 2, 1973.

From 1979 to 1983, the building was occupied by Mutual Federal Savings and Loan Association. Tiffany's Ice Cream Parlor was the last business in the building, from 1984 to 2007.

The building was donated to the Licking County Foundation in December 2013. The Licking County Foundation plans to restore the building, and when the renovation is complete, Explore Licking County, the county's convention and visitors bureau will move into the space.

In October 2016, basement rehabilitation was completed. Restoration started in 2018 with the exterior.

Images

Other Louis Sullivan "jewel boxes"
National Farmer's Bank, Owatonna, Minnesota (1908)
Peoples Savings Bank, Cedar Rapids, Iowa (1912)
Henry Adams Building, Algona, Iowa (1913)
Merchants' National Bank, Grinnell, Iowa (1914)
Purdue State Bank, West Lafayette, Indiana (1914)
People's Federal Savings and Loan Association, Sidney, Ohio (1918)
Farmers and Merchants Bank, Columbus, Wisconsin (1919)

References

Further reading

 Elia, Mario Manieri, Louis Henry Sullivan, Princeton Architectural Press, Princeton NY, 1996
 Kvaran, Einar Einarsson, The Louis Sullivan Pilgrimage, unpublished manuscript
 Morrison, Hugh, "Louis Sullivan: Prophet of Modern Architecture", W.W. Norton and Company, New York, 1963
 Tebben, Joseph R., "The Old Home: Louis Sullivan's Newark Bank", McDonald & Woodward Publishing Company, Newark OH, 2014
 Twombly, Robert, Louis Sullivan: His Life and Work, Elizabeth Sifton Books - Viking, New York, 1986
 Vinci, John, "The Art Institute of Chicago: The Stock Exchange Trading Room", The Art Institute of Chicago, Chicago IL, 1977

Commercial buildings on the National Register of Historic Places in Ohio
Commercial buildings completed in 1914
Louis Sullivan buildings
Newark, Ohio
Buildings and structures in Licking County, Ohio
National Register of Historic Places in Licking County, Ohio
Bank buildings on the National Register of Historic Places in Ohio
Art Nouveau architecture in Ohio
Art Nouveau commercial buildings